Aethes kandovana is a species of moth of the family Tortricidae. It is found in Iran.

The wingspan is about 17 mm. The ground colour of the forewings is yellowish with glossy pearly scales and two rust-brown fasciae. The hindwings are pale brownish grey.

Etymology
The species name is derived from Kandovān, the type locality.

References

Moths described in 2009
kandovana
Moths of Asia